Major Eric Tremayne Buller   (3 January 1894 – 8 August 1973) was an English cricketer and decorated British Army officer.

Early life and military career
Born in Highworth, Wiltshire, he was educated at Harrow School, where he represented the school cricket team. In the First World War, Buller served in the initially Devonshire Regiment. In May 1915, he was listed in the London Gazette as having attended the Royal Military College, Sandhurst, passing out to be commissioned as a second lieutenant into the Duke of Cornwall's Light Infantry. In the January 1917 Supplement to the London Gazette, Buller was listed as being promoted to temporary Lieutenant from the rank of 2nd Lieutenant that he held, this time in the Duke of Cornwall's Light Infantry. During the course of the Great War he was awarded the Military Cross. He later served in the 2nd Battalion Duke of Cornwall's Light Infantry as part of the British Rhine Army occupying the Rhineland. He eventually retired from the Army at some point prior to the Second World War, holding the rank of Major.

Cricket career
Buller made his only first-class appearance following the war for the Army against the Cambridge University at Fenner's in 1919. In this match he scored 46 runs in the Army first-innings, before being dismissed by Arthur Gilligan. In their second-innings he scored an unbeaten 12 runs. With the ball he claimed 11 wicket-less overs. Buller played for the British Rhine Army, the occupying British force in Rhine Land, in 1922 against the Marylebone Cricket Club at Cologne. In 1924, he made his Minor Counties Championship debut for Devon against the Surrey Second XI. He represented Devon until 1926, and returned in 1931 to play a single match against Cornwall.

Personal life
On 22 July 1922, he married Dorothy Bridget Tyrwhitt-Drake, with whom he had three daughters, Tresilla, Margaret and Belinda. Tresilla married Lt.-Col. Sir John Charles Arthur Digby Lawson, 3rd Bt (1912–2001).  He changed his name to Eric Tremayne Buller Leyborne Popham on 15 October 1943. He died in Bath, Somerset on 8 August 1973. His grandfather Francis Leyborne Popham played first-class cricket for Oxford University and the Gentlemen of Kent.

References

External links
 Eric Buller at ESPNcricinfo
 Eric Buller at CricketArchive

1894 births
1973 deaths
People from Highworth
People from Wiltshire
People educated at Harrow School
British Army personnel of World War I
Devonshire Regiment officers
Duke of Cornwall's Light Infantry officers
Recipients of the Military Cross
English cricketers
British Army cricketers
Devon cricketers
Graduates of the Royal Military College, Sandhurst
Military personnel from Wiltshire
Eric